Caenorhabditis monodelphis is a species of nematodes in the genus Caenorhabditis. It was first collected by J. Raschka in Berlin, Germany in 2001. A second isolate was collected from Norway. It is a freeliving species found in galleries inside of the fungus Ganoderma applanatum (Polyporaceae) which grew on the stump of a tree a few centimeters above ground. It is phoretic on beetles of the species Cis castaneus.

C. monodelphis (C. sp. 1) groups with Caenorhabditis plicata outside either the 'Drosophilae' or the 'Elegans' supergroups in phylogenetic studies. Its genome was sequenced by the Edinburgh Genomics Facility, University of Edinburgh.

Several strains are known and kept in labs. Strain SB341 can be maintained on OP50 E. coli plates.

References

External links
 
 Caenorhabditis sp. 1 at nematodes.org
 Caenorhabditis sp. 1 JU1667 at uniprot.org

2001 in Germany
monodelphis
Fauna of Germany
Nematodes described in 2017
History of Berlin
University of Edinburgh